Henry Davis McHenry (February 27, 1826 – December 17, 1890) was a U.S. Representative from Kentucky, son of John Hardin McHenry.

Born in Hartford, Kentucky, McHenry attended the public schools at Hartford, and was graduated from the law department of Transylvania University, Lexington, Kentucky, in 1845.
He was admitted to the bar in 1845 and commenced practice in Hartford.
He served as member of the Kentucky House of Representatives 1851-1853 and 1865-1867.
He served in the Kentucky State Senate 1861-1865.
He served as member of the Democratic National Committee from 1872 until his death.

McHenry was elected as a Democrat to the Forty-second Congress (March 4, 1871 – March 3, 1873).
He resumed the practice of his profession in Hartford.
He served as delegate to the State constitutional convention in 1890.
He died in Hartford, Kentucky, December 17, 1890.
He was interred in Oakwood Cemetery.
The town of McHenry, Kentucky is named in his honor.

References

1826 births
1890 deaths
Democratic Party Kentucky state senators
Democratic Party members of the Kentucky House of Representatives
Transylvania University alumni
Kentucky lawyers
People from Hartford, Kentucky
Democratic Party members of the United States House of Representatives from Kentucky
19th-century American politicians
19th-century American lawyers